Direct School Admission (DSA) is a scheme in Singapore introduced in 2004 for students who are entering secondary school or junior college. The scheme allows education institutions to select and enroll students based on both their academic and non-academic talents and achievements instead of purely academic results.

History 
The DSA was introduced in 2004. The scheme is initially opened to seven secondary schools who offered Integrated Programme to their students.

The DSA scheme will be reviewed under two guiding principles, announced Acting Minister for Education (Schools) Ng Chee Meng in the Committee of Supply Debate in Parliament today (8 Apr). Ng noted that while the scheme has benefitted many students, there was some unevenness in how different schools select students. The review aims to expand opportunities for students with specific aptitudes and talents by providing more schools with distinctive programmes. This will allow students with specific domain talents and achievements to be recognised – which was its original objective – instead of general academic ability.

In 2014, Education Minister Heng Swee Keat announced that DSA will be expanded slightly, allowing secondary schools an extra selection criteria to assess and select students for the program.

Program
The first few number of students in the ranking determined by the school are given a confirmed offer. Should a Primary 6 student receive a confirmed offer from any school, he or she will receive a School Preference Form in late October after his or her Primary School Leaving Examination (PSLE) and will not participate in the S1 Posting Exercise. Although it is said that the student has been guaranteed a place in the Secondary School, he will lose the offer if he is not eligible for the lowest academic stream (Special, Express, Normal (Academic), Normal (Technical)) the school offers according to his PSLE results. In this case, he will have to participate in the S1 Posting Exercise

The following few students in the ranking also determined by the school will enter the waiting list. Those who are in the waiting list will fill up the vacancies after some students who receives a confirmed offer has decided to reject the offer. They will enter the school according to their order in the ranking until all vacancies for the school's DSA exercise has been filled up. The student will also receive a School Preference Form in late October after his PSLE. If he enters the school via DSA successfully, he need not participate in the S1 Posting Exercise. Like the students who received a confirmed offer, the student will lose the offer if he is not eligible for the lowest academic stream (Special, Express, Normal (Academic), Normal (Technical)) the school offers according to his PSLE results. 

The students who are not ranked high enough in the school's DSA ranking will be rejected. If he does not have any other offers (including waiting list), he will not receive a School Preference Form and will have to participate in the S1 Posting Exercise. 

As of 2009, there are 74 schools which allows students to enroll in their schools via DSA.

References

External links
Reference Article to DSA
Reference article to Discretionary Admissions